Saphenista lineata is a species of moth of the family Tortricidae. It is found in Azuay Province, Ecuador.

The wingspan is about 16 mm. The ground colour of the forewings is glossy whitish, suffused with brownish, with white along the edges of the markings and stronger suffusions in the distal part of the wing.

References

Moths described in 2002
Saphenista